Vichtenstein (Bavarian: Viatnstoa) is a municipality in the district of Schärding in the Austrian state of Upper Austria.

Geography
Vichtenstein lies in the Innviertel. About 60 percent of the municipality is forest, and 29 percent is farmland.

References

Cities and towns in Schärding District